Commins may refer to

Commins, Denbighshire, a village in Wales
Commins Coch, a village in Powys, Wales
Commins (surname)

See also 
Commin
Comins (disambiguation)